Suzy Solidor (18 December 1900 – 30 March 1983) was a French singer and actress, appearing in films such as La Garçonne.

Suzy Solidor was born Suzanne Louise Marie Marion in 1900 in the Pie district of Saint-Servan-sur-Mer in Brittany, France. She was the daughter of Louise Marie Adeline Marion, a 28-year-old single mother. In 1907 she became Suzy Rocher when her mother married Eugène Prudent Rocher. She later changed her name to Suzy Solidor when she moved to Paris in the late 1920s, taking the name from a district of Saint-Servan in which she had lived.

Early in 1930, she became a popular singer and opened a chic nightclub called La Vie Parisienne. She was openly lesbian.

One of the singer’s most famous publicity stunts was to become known as the “most painted woman in the world”. She posed for some of the most celebrated artists of the day including Pablo Picasso, Georges Braque, Raoul Dufy, Tamara de Lempicka, Marie Laurencin, Francis Picabia and Kees van Dongen. Her stipulation for sitting was that she would be given the paintings to hang in her club, and, by this time, she had accumulated thirty-three portraits of herself. La Vie Parisienne became one of the trendiest night spots in Paris.

Solidor's most famous portrait was painted by Tamara de Lempicka.

Solidor met Tamara de Lempicka sometime in the early 1930s, and Suzy asked the artist to paint her. Tamara agreed, but only if she could paint Solidor in the nude. Solidor agreed, and the painting was finished in 1933.

During the occupation, her nightclub was popular with German officers; in 1941 she recorded a version of the song "Lili Marleen" with French words by Henri Lemarchand. After the war she was convicted by the Épuration légale as a collaborator and punished with five years without public activities.

She died on 30 March 1983 in Cagnes-sur-Mer and is buried in the town. Ten years before, in 1973, she gave 40 of her portraits to the village. They are permanently exhibited at the Château-Musée Grimaldi Museum.

She was the subject of the song "Sad Songs" by the English group The Christians in their eponymous first album.

References

External links
 Biographical profile of Suzy Solidor
 Gallery of Suzy Solidor portraits
 Obituary: "Mort de la chanteuse Suzy Solidor", 1983  

French film actresses
French LGBT singers
French lesbian actresses
1900 births
1983 deaths
20th-century French businesswomen
20th-century French businesspeople
Lesbian singers
French LGBT businesspeople
Nightclub owners
People from Saint-Malo
Actresses from Paris
Musicians from Paris
20th-century French actresses
20th-century French women singers